Chris Fusaro (born 21 July 1989 in Kirkcaldy, Scotland) is a Scotland international rugby union player. He plays for Glasgow Warriors as a flanker.

Rugby Union career

Amateur career

Early in 2007 he was among a group of boys who achieved a notable double in playing for two trophy-winning teams at Murrayfield in eight days – Bell Baxter High School beating Dollar Academy 20–8 in the Bell Lawrie Scottish Schools Cup final, and Howe of Fife winning the SRU Youth League final against Musselburgh by 27–14.

He plays for Stirling County when not needed by the Warriors.

Professional career

Fusaro signed for Glasgow Warriors in summer 2010.

He had to be patient in his first season at Warriors but he burst into the team in season 2011–12 establishing himself as a key component of the Glasgow pack, noted for his aggression and ball-winning ability at openside.

He was voted Glasgow Warriors' 2011–12 Player of the Year by the club's fans (with 40% of the vote), having already been named Players' Player of the Season and the club's Player of the Season.
He was rewarded with a contract extension that kept him at the club until the end of May 2014.

He has now made over 100 appearances for the Warriors and is contracted till 2018.

International career

Fusaro won honours at all three Scotland age-grade levels from under-18 to under-20 as well as Scotland 7s and Scotland A squads.

Fusaro represented Scotland A at the IRB Nations Cup in Romania and represented his country at rugby sevens in the 2010 Commonwealth Games in Delhi.

In sevens, he played for the Rugby Ecosse Scotland squad in the Singapore event in October 2007, played for Scotland in the eight tournaments on the 2007–08 IRB Sevens World Series as well as a further two in the edition.

Coaching career

On 21 July 2016 it was announced that Fusaro would become a backroom coach at Stirling County in addition to his Warriors duties.

He moved to be an Assistant Coach of Glasgow High Kelvinside in 2019.

Outside of rugby

Athletics

Fusaro was also part of the Bell Baxter 4 × 100 m relay team which won the Scottish Schools Under-17 Championship.

Family

He is of Scottish and Italian ancestry.

On 13 June 2015 Fusaro married his long term girlfriend, Katie Megan Fusaro.

On 9 June 2016 Fusaro and his wife, Katie Fusaro, gave birth to their first child Sofia Rita Fusaro.

On 16 April 2018 Federico David Fusaro joined the family.

References

External links
 
 

1989 births
Living people
Scottish rugby union coaches
Scottish rugby union players
Scotland international rugby union players
Rugby union flankers
Glasgow Warriors players
Alumni of the University of Edinburgh
People educated at Bell Baxter High School
Italian Scottish rugby union players
Scotland international rugby sevens players
Scotland 'A' international rugby union players
Stirling County RFC players
Howe of Fife RFC players
Male rugby sevens players
Commonwealth Games rugby sevens players of Scotland
Rugby sevens players at the 2010 Commonwealth Games
Rugby union players from Kirkcaldy